Nirza Parish is an administrative unit of Ludza Municipality, Latvia. The Ludza dialect used to be spoken in Nirza

Towns, villages and settlements of Nirza Parish

References

Parishes of Latvia
Ludza Municipality